Rho Pi Phi International Pharmaceutical Fraternity is a co-ed professional fraternity that dedicates itself to the profession of pharmacy and to friendship, professionalism, and community service.

Rho Pi Phi was founded on January 20, 1919 on the campus of Massachusetts College of Pharmacy as the Ram Bam pharmaceutical Society.  However, in the following year, its members agreed to form Rho Pi Phi, a pharmaceutical fraternity. Rho Pi Phi was founded to promote friendship, professionalism, and community service. The thirteen founders and charter members of Rho Pi Phi were: Joseph Dunn, Hyman Wolf, Ralph Polian, Samuel Deutchman, Isaac Weiser, Samuel Nannis, Samuel Greenberg, Israel Stone, Robert Goodless, Irving Zolotoy, Max Stoller, and Louis Tankel. These thirteen men felt the impact of segregation and therefore formed a non-sectarian organization.

International status was gained with the formation of a Canadian group, Nu chapter, at the University of Toronto in 1926. In 1922, the first national convention was held and the Constitution was adopted. Alumni chapters were later organized in order to enable members to continue active participation in Rho Pi Phi after graduation.

Motto
...To maintain the ethical standards, dignity of, and pride in the most ancient and honorable profession of pharmacy.
...To contribute to the moral, social, and intellectual welfare of all students in Pharmacy.
...That we may take the lamp of research into the dark recesses of things unknown and make our contribution to our fellow man.

Chapters
 Beta  - Albany College of Pharmacy and Health Sciences (Active)
 Upsilon Lambda - California Northstate University (Active)
 Lambda Sigma Delta - University of the Pacific (Active)
 Sigma - University of Florida College of Pharmacy
 Beta Galen - University of the Sciences in Philadelphia
 Delta Kappa Sigma - University of Illinois, Chicago
 Gamma Gamma Rho - Midwestern University (Active)
 Lambda - University of California San Francisco
 Kappa - University of Southern California

See also 
 List of Jewish fraternities and sororities
 Professional fraternities and sororities
 Rho Chi, co-ed, pharmacy honor society

References

Student organizations established in 1918
1918 establishments in Massachusetts
Professional medical fraternities and sororities in the United States
Historically Jewish fraternities in the United States
Professional Fraternity Association
Jewish organizations established in 1919
Professional pharmaceutical fraternities and sororities in the United States